Farmer's Bank of Carson Valley may refer to the following bank buildings:
Farmer's Bank of Carson Valley (1596 Esmeralda Avenue, Minden, Nevada), the first Farmer's Bank building in Minden
Farmer's Bank of Carson Valley (1597 Esmeralda Avenue, Minden, Nevada), the second Farmer's Bank building in Minden